Gary Shapiro is an American journalist. A  graduate of Harvard university and Columbia Law School he has written for numerous publications including The New York Sun (where he penned the "Knickerbocker" column)
, The Forward and The Wall Street Journal. He is also a former contributing editor to The American Scholar magazine.

While at the New York Sun he wrote on the Frederick Brockway Gleason III case in Savannah, Georgia. The victim was a direct descendant of the family who once published the New York Sun's forerunner The Sun.[2].

Shapiro formerly served on the board of directors and is the current admissions committee chair of the National Arts Club in New York City. He also was a board member of the National Coalition of Independent Scholars and served out a term which ended in 2014.

References

External links
For the Wall Street Journal - 
For the "Forward" - 
National Arts Club - 

Year of birth missing (living people)
Living people
American male journalists
Columbia Law School alumni
Harvard University alumni